Marek Hrbas (born March 4, 1993) is a Czech professional ice hockey defenseman. He is currently playing with HC Verva Litvínov of the Czech Extraliga (ELH).

Playing career
Hrbas played as a youth in his native Czech Republic within HC Plzeň before embarking on a major junior career in North America, playing in the United States Hockey League with the Fargo Force before joining the Western Hockey League (WHL) with the Edmonton Oil Kings in the 2010–11 season and later playing two seasons with the Kamloops Blazers.

Hrbas made his Czech Extraliga debut playing with HC Sparta Praha during the 2013–14 Czech Extraliga season.

During the 2018-19 season, with Hrbas playing in his sixth year in the Czech Extraliga, he appeared in 22 games with HC Vítkovice for 4 points. At the mid-point of the campaign, Hrbas left the ELH, opting to join Russian club, Amur Khabarovsk of the KHL, for the remainder of the season on December 5, 2018.

Career statistics

Regular season and playoffs

International

References

External links

1993 births
Living people
Czech ice hockey defencemen
People from Klatovy
Fargo Force players
Edmonton Oil Kings players
Kamloops Blazers players
HC Sparta Praha players
HC Vítkovice players
Amur Khabarovsk players
BK Mladá Boleslav players
Sportspeople from the Plzeň Region
Czech expatriate ice hockey players in Canada
Czech expatriate ice hockey players in the United States